Wu Qian (born July 7, 1994) is a Chinese professional basketball player who plays for the Zhejiang Golden Bulls of the Chinese Basketball Association.

He represented China's national basketball team at the 2017 FIBA Asia Cup in Zouk Mikael, Lebanon, where he recorded China's best 2 point field goal percentage.

In the 2020–21 Chinese Basketball Association season he won the CBA Most Valuable Player award.

Wu was included in China's squad for the 2023 FIBA Basketball World Cup qualification.

References

External links
2017 FIBA Asia Cup Profile
Asia-basket.com Profile
REAL GM Profile

1994 births
Living people
Basketball players from Zhejiang
Chinese men's basketball players
Guards (basketball)
People from Jinhua
Zhejiang Golden Bulls players